Roli Pereira de Sa (born 10 December 1996) is a French professional footballer who plays as a midfielder for  club Sochaux.

Career

Paris Saint-Germain
Pereira de Sa joined the Paris Saint-Germain Academy in 2011. In January 2016, he was loaned to Paris FC until the end of the season. He made his debut with the Ligue 2 team on 29 January 2016 in a match against Brest.
Pereira de Sa was loaned to Tours on 31 August 2016. He was sent back to Paris Saint-Germain on 1 January 2017.

Nantes
Peireira de Sa joined Nantes on 8 August 2017 for four seasons.

Sochaux
On 1 June 2022, Pereira de Sa signed for Ligue 2 side Sochaux on a three-year contract.

Personal life
Born in France, Pereira de Sa is of Angolan and DR Congolese descent.

Career statistics

Honours
Nantes
Coupe de France: 2021–22

References

External links
 
 

Living people
1996 births
Association football midfielders
French footballers
France youth international footballers
French sportspeople of Democratic Republic of the Congo descent
French people of Angolan descent
Ligue 1 players
Ligue 2 players
Paris FC players
Tours FC players
FC Nantes players
FC Sochaux-Montbéliard players
People from Mantes-la-Jolie
Footballers from Yvelines
Black French sportspeople